Double-entry bookkeeping, also known as double-entry accounting, is a method of bookkeeping that relies on a two-sided accounting entry to maintain financial information.  Every entry to an account requires a corresponding and opposite entry to a different account. The double-entry system has two equal and corresponding sides known as debit and credit. A transaction in double-entry bookkeeping always affects at least two accounts, always includes at least one debit and one credit, and always has total debits and total credits that are equal. The purpose of double-entry bookkeeping is to allow the detection of financial errors and fraud.

For example, if a business takes out a bank loan for $10,000, recording the transaction would require a debit of $10,000 to an asset account called "Cash", as well as a credit of $10,000 to a liability account called "Loan Payable".

The basic entry to record this transaction in a general ledger will look like this:

Double-entry bookkeeping is based on balancing the accounting equation. The accounting equation serves as an error detection tool; if at any point the sum of debits for all accounts does not equal the corresponding sum of credits for all accounts, an error has occurred. However, satisfying the equation does not guarantee a lack of errors; the ledger may still "balance" even if the wrong ledger accounts have been debited or credited.

History 

The earliest extant accounting records that follow the modern double-entry system in Europe come from Amatino Manucci, a Florentine merchant at the end of the 13th century.  Manucci was employed by the Farolfi firm and the firm's ledger of 1299–1300 evidences full double-entry bookkeeping. Giovannino Farolfi & Company, a firm of Florentine merchants  headquartered in Nîmes, acted as moneylenders to the Archbishop of Arles, their most important customer. Some sources suggest that Giovanni di Bicci de' Medici introduced this method for the Medici bank in the 14th century, though evidence for this is lacking.

The double-entry system began to propagate for practice in Italian merchant cities during the 14th century. Before this there may have been systems of accounting records on multiple books which, however, do not yet have the formal and methodical rigor necessary to control the business economy. In the course of the 16th century, Venice produced the theoretical accounting science by the writings of Luca Pacioli, Domenico Manzoni, Bartolomeo Fontana, the accountant Alvise Casanova and the erudite Giovanni Antonio Tagliente.

Benedetto Cotrugli, a Ragusan merchant and ambassador to Naples, described double-entry bookkeeping in his treatise Della mercatura e del mercante perfetto. Although it was originally written in 1458, no manuscript older than 1475 is known to remain, and the treatise was not printed until 1573. The printer shortened and altered Cotrugli's treatment of double-entry bookkeeping, obscuring the history of the subject. Luca Pacioli, a Franciscan friar and collaborator of Leonardo da Vinci, first codified the system in his mathematics textbook Summa de arithmetica, geometria, proportioni et proportionalità published in Venice in 1494. Pacioli is often called the "father of accounting" because he was the first to publish a detailed description of the double-entry system, thus enabling others to study and use it.

In pre-modern Europe, double-entry bookkeeping had theological and cosmological connotations, recalling "both the scales of justice and the symmetry of God's world".

Other claimants 

Per some sources, double-entry bookkeeping was first pioneered by the Romans and in the Jewish community of the early-medieval Middle East. In AD 70 Pliny the Elder described the structure of the "Tabulae Rationum" as "On one page all the disbursements are entered, on the other page all the receipts; both pages constitute a whole for each operation
of every man".
11th century Jewish bankers in Cairo used an intermediary form of credit-debit accounts in some of their documentation. The Italian system has similarities with the older Indian "Jama–Nama" system which had debits and credits in a reverse order. It is B. M. Lall Nigam's opinion that the Italian merchants likely learned the method from their interaction with ancient Indian merchants during the Greek and Roman sea trade relations, though he is unable to substantiate this with evidence. The oldest European record of a complete double-entry system is the Messari (Italian: Treasurer's) accounts of the Republic of Genoa in 1340. The Messari accounts contain debits and credits journalised in a bilateral form, and include balances carried forward from the preceding year, and therefore enjoy general recognition as a double-entry system. By the end of the 15th century, the bankers and merchants of Florence, Genoa, Venice and Lübeck used this system widely.

The double-entry accounting method was said to be developed independently earlier in Korea during the Goryeo dynasty (918–1392) when Kaesong was a center of trade and industry. The Four-element bookkeeping system was said to originate in the 11th or 12th century.

Accounting entries 

In the double-entry accounting system, at least two accounting entries are required to record each financial transaction. These entries may occur in asset, liability, equity, expense, or revenue accounts. Recording of a debit amount to one or more accounts and an equal credit amount to one or more accounts results in total debits being equal to total credits when considering all accounts in the general ledger. If the accounting entries are recorded without error, the aggregate balance of all accounts having Debit balances will be equal to the aggregate balance of all accounts having Credit balances. Accounting entries that debit and credit related accounts typically include the same date and identifying code in both accounts, so that in case of error, each debit and credit can be traced back to a journal and transaction source document, thus preserving an audit trail. The accounting entries are recorded in the "Books of Accounts". Regardless of which accounts and how many are involved by a given transaction, the fundamental accounting equation of assets equal liabilities plus equity will hold.

Approaches
There are two different ways to record the effects of debits and credits on accounts in the double-entry system of bookkeeping. They are the Traditional Approach and the Accounting Equation Approach. Irrespective of the approach used, the effect on the books of accounts remains the same, with two aspects (debit and credit) in each of the transactions.

Traditional approach
Following the Traditional Approach (also called the British Approach) accounts are classified as real, personal, and nominal accounts. Real accounts are accounts relating to assets both tangible and intangible in nature. Personal accounts are accounts relating to persons or organisations with whom the business has transactions and will mainly consist of accounts of debtors and creditors. Nominal accounts are accounts relating to revenue, expenses, gains, and losses. Transactions are entered in the books of accounts by applying the following golden rules of accounting:
 Real account: Debit what comes in and credit what goes out.
 Personal account: Debit the receiver and credit the giver.
 Nominal account: Debit all expenses & losses and credit all incomes & gains

Accounting equation approach
This approach is also called the American approach. Under this approach transactions are recorded based on the accounting equation, i.e., Assets = Liabilities + Capital. The accounting equation is a statement of equality between the debits and the credits. The rules of debit and credit depend on the nature of an account. For the purpose of the accounting equation approach, all the accounts are classified into the following five types: assets, capital, liabilities, revenues/incomes, or expenses/losses.

If there is an increase or decrease in a set of accounts, there will be equal decrease or increase in another set of accounts. Accordingly, the following rules of debit and credit hold for the various categories of accounts:
 Assets Accounts: debit entry represents an increase in assets and a credit entry represents a decrease in assets.
 Capital Account: credit entry represents an increase in capital and a debit entry represents a decrease in capital.
 Liabilities Accounts: credit entry represents an increase in liabilities and a debit entry represents a decrease in liabilities.
 Revenues or Incomes Accounts: credit entry represents an increase in incomes and gains, and debit entry represents a decrease in incomes and gains.
 Expenses or Losses Accounts: debit entry represents an increase in expenses and losses, and credit entry represents a decrease in expenses and losses.
These five rules help learning about accounting entries and also are comparable with traditional (British) accounting rules.

Books of accounts  

Each financial transaction is recorded in at least two different nominal ledger accounts within the financial accounting system, so that the total debits equals the total credits in the general ledger, i.e. the accounts balance. This is a partial check that each and every transaction has been correctly recorded. The transaction is recorded as a "debit entry" (Dr) in one account, and a "credit entry" (Cr) in a second account. The debit entry will be recorded on the debit side (left-hand side) of a general ledger account, and the credit entry will be recorded on the credit side (right-hand side) of a general ledger account. If the total of the entries on the debit side of one account is greater than the total on the credit side of the same nominal account, that account is said to have a debit balance.

Double entry is used only in nominal ledgers. It is not used in daybooks (journals), which normally do not form part of the nominal ledger system. The information from the daybooks will be used in the nominal ledger and it is the nominal ledgers that will ensure the integrity of the resulting financial information created from the daybooks (provided that the information recorded in the daybooks is correct).

The reason for this is to limit the number of entries in the nominal ledger: entries in the daybooks can be totalled before they are entered in the nominal ledger. If there are only a relatively small number of transactions it may be simpler instead to treat the daybooks as an integral part of the nominal ledger and thus of the double-entry system.

However, as can be seen from the examples of daybooks shown below, it is still necessary to check, within each daybook, that the postings from the daybook balance.

The double entry system uses nominal ledger accounts. From these nominal ledger accounts, a trial balance can be created. The trial balance lists all the nominal ledger account balances. The list is split into two columns, with debit balances placed in the left hand column and credit balances placed in the right hand column. Another column will contain the name of the nominal ledger account describing what each value is for. The total of the debit column must equal the total of the credit column.

Debits and credits

Double-entry bookkeeping is governed by the accounting equation. If revenue equals expenses, the following (basic) equation must be true:

assets = liabilities + equity

For the accounts to remain in balance, a change in one account must be matched with a change in another account. These changes are made by debits and credits to the accounts. Note that the usage of these terms in accounting is not identical to their everyday usage. Whether one uses a debit or credit to increase or decrease an account depends on the normal balance of the account. Assets, Expenses, and Drawings accounts (on the left side of the equation) have a normal balance of debit. Liability, Revenue, and Capital accounts (on the right side of the equation) have a normal balance of credit. On a general ledger, debits are recorded on the left side and credits on the right side for each account. Since the accounts must always balance, for each transaction there will be a debit made to one or several accounts and a credit made to one or several accounts. The sum of all debits made in each day's transactions must equal the sum of all credits in those transactions. After a series of transactions, therefore, the sum of all the accounts with a debit balance will equal the sum of all the accounts with a credit balance.

Debits and credits are numbers recorded as follows:
 Debits are recorded on the left side of a ledger account, a.k.a. T account. Debits increase balances in asset accounts and expense accounts and decrease balances in liability accounts, revenue accounts, and capital accounts.
 Credits are recorded on the right side of a T account in a ledger. Credits increase balances in liability accounts, revenue accounts, and capital accounts, and decrease balances in asset accounts and expense accounts.
 Debit accounts are asset and expense accounts that usually have debit balances, i.e. the total debits usually exceed the total credits in each debit account.
 Credit accounts are revenue (income, gains) accounts and liability accounts that usually have credit balances.

The mnemonic DEADCLIC is used to help remember the effect of debit or credit transactions on the relevant accounts. DEAD: Debit to increase Expense, Asset and Drawing accounts and CLIC: Credit to increase Liability, Income and Capital accounts.

A second popular mnemonic is DEA-LER, where DEA represents Dividend, Expenses, Assets for Debit increases, and Liabilities, Equity, Revenue for Credit increases.

The account types are related as follows:
current equity = sum of equity changes across time (increases on the left side are debits, and increases on the right side are credits, and vice versa for decreases)
current equity = Assets – Liabilities
sum of equity changes across time = owner's investment (Capital above) + Revenues – Expenses

See also
 Debits and credits
 Desi Namu
 Momentum accounting and triple-entry bookkeeping
 Merdiban
 Nostro and vostro accounts
 Single-entry bookkeeping

Notes and references

Further reading

External links

 A Concise Explanation of the Accounting Equation
 Bean Counter's bookkeeping tutorial
 GnuCash data entry concepts, GnuCash website

Accounting systems
Italian inventions
Accounting terminology
History of accounting
Economic history of Italy